This is a list of commercially-available battery types summarizing some of their characteristics for ready comparison.

Common characteristics

 Cost in USD, adjusted for inflation.

 Typical. See  for alternative electrode materials.

Rechargeable characteristics

Thermal runaway
Under certain conditions, some battery chemistries are at risk of thermal runaway, leading to cell rupture or combustion. As thermal runaway is determined not only by cell chemistry but also cell size, cell design and charge, only the worst-case values are reflected here.

NiCd vs. NiMH vs. Li-ion vs. Li–polymer vs. LTO

See also 
 Battery nomenclature
 Experimental rechargeable battery types
 Aluminium battery
 List of battery sizes
 List of battery types
 Search for the Super Battery (2017 PBS film)

References